Roulado Football Club de la Gonâve is a professional football club based in Gonâve Island, Haiti. The team was promoted to the top division of football in Haiti in 2014. It plays at two stadiums. The primary stadium, Parc Savil Dessain is located at the countryside of the island and Parc Tony Wolf, a substitute stadium, is located at Anse-à-Galets.

A notable player is former Haiti international forward Jean-Robert Menelas who, as of 2008, had become all-time leading goalscorer in the Haitian top division during 14 years playing for Roulado, his only club.

Honours
 Ligue Haïtienne: 2
 2002 Ouverture, 2003 Clôture

International competitions
 CFU Club Championship: 1 appearance
2001 – Second Round – Group B – 3rd place – 1 pt (stage 2 of 2)

References

Football clubs in Haiti
Ouest (department)